Science Policy Research Unit (SPRU) is a research centre based at University of Sussex in Falmer, near Brighton, UK. It focuses on long term transformative change, science policy and innovation across different sectors, societies and structures. It was one of the first interdisciplinary research centres in the field of science and technology policy and at the forefront of the development of innovation as an academic discipline. Alongside internationally renowned research, SPRU also offers a range of MSc courses, as well as PhD research degrees.

SPRU's research today addresses pressing global policy agendas, including the future of industrial policy, inclusive economic growth; the politics of scientific expertise, energy policy, security issues, entrepreneurship, and pathways to a more sustainable future. It aims to tackle real-world questions whilst also contributing to theoretical knowledge on innovation. In 2018, SPRU ranked 3rd in the world and 1st in the UK for top science and technology think tanks on the Global Go ToThink Tank Index Report which was put together by the University of Pennsylvania.

SPRU has 60 plus faculty members and more than 150 MSc and 50 doctoral students. With an extensive global alumni network among senior science and technology policy makers, SPRU is committed to engagement and generating impact at all stages of research. Members of SPRU work closely with government and parliament, think tanks, media, business and the third sector, and are experienced in disseminating and applying their latest research findings.

Organization
The Science Policy Research Unit is located within the University of Sussex Business School in Brighton, UK. SPRU's current director is Professor Jeremy Hall, formerly director of the Centre for Social Innovation Management at Surrey Business School and editor-in-chief of the Journal of Engineering and Technology Management. He took over from Professor Johan Schot in September 2019.

SPRU is also home to a number of specialist research centres including:
Sussex Energy Group (SEG)
Sussex Sustainability Research Programme (SSRP)
The STEPS Centre (Co-hosted with the Institute of Development Studies)
Harvard Sussex Program (a long-standing partnership with Harvard University in the field of biological and chemical weapons)
Creative Industries Policy and Evidence Centre (in partnership with Nesta)
Centre for Research into Energy Demand Solutions – Digital Society strand
National Centre for Energy Systems Integration (in partnership with four other research-intensive universities and strategic partner Siemens)
Transformative Innovation Policy Consortium (TIPC)

History
SPRU was founded in 1966 by Professor Christopher Freeman, a pioneer of what is known as innovation studies today. Professor Freeman ‘embraced an ‘economics of hope’ which embodied a positive view of our potential to direct innovation, creativity and new technologies towards more sustainable and inclusive futures’.

Since its foundation SPRU has had (and continues to have) a long list of highly regarded scholars among its faculty including Daniele Archibugi, Giovanni Dosi, Marie Jahoda, Carlota Perez, Keith Pavitt, Mary Kaldor, Richard R. Nelson, Giorgio Sirilli and Luc Soete.

Current faculty members include Benjamin Sovacool, director of the Sussex Energy Group and advisor on energy to the European Commission's Directorate General for Research and Innovation; Andy Stirling, deputy director of the Sustainable Lifestyles Research Group; Caitriona McLeish, co-director of the Harvard Sussex Program on Chemical and Biological Weapons; Gordon MacKerron, former director of SPRU; Maria Savona, editor for Research Policy and the Journal of Evolutionary Economics; Paul Nightingale, director of strategy and operations for the Economic & Social Research Council; Erik Millstone, co-author of The Atlas of Food; and Ben Martin, editor of Research Policy and Associate Fellow of Cambridge's Centre for Science and Policy.

Current research priorities
SPRU research activities are extremely diverse, and are grouped into five main research themes:

1, Science, Politics and Decision Making: Researchers at SPRU apply a deep historical understanding to how the choices made about science and technology shape our societies. They also work on the politics of expertise, and on issues of foresight, research assessment, metrics and impact in today's research environment.

2, Energy: SPRU is part of the Sussex Energy Group, one of the largest independent social science energy policy research groups in the world. Researchers at SPRU seek to understand and encourage transitions to sustainable, low carbon energy systems.

3, Sustainable Development: Since the 1970s SPRU has been at the heart of international debates about the role of science, technology and innovation in fostering sustainable development around the world. SPRU's aim is to help organisations, industries and policy makers realize diverse pathways to sustainability.

4, Economics of Innovation: Researchers at SPRU seek to understand the structure and dynamics of innovating firms and industrial systems and how to manage innovation capabilities in firms, including research and technology change in high-tech industries and managing uncertainty in complex systems.

5, Innovation & Project Management: SPRU's work includes analysis of technology strategy, new technology based firms, complex systems and products, high-growth new ventures, as well as looking at innovation in different business models and sectors, including infrastructure, healthcare, biopharmaceuticals and services.

Studying at SPRU/Teaching
From technology policy and managing innovation, to fostering sustainability, international development and understanding complex energy systems, students at SPRU benefit from working at the frontier of new knowledge on some of today's most pressing global policy agendas. SPRU offers problem-led, rather than discipline-based teaching.

SPRU currently offers six Masters courses, two of which are available for online distance learners. SPRU also offers two PhD degrees, in Science and Technology Policy Studies and Technology and Innovation Management.

Harvard Sussex Program
The Harvard Sussex Program (HSP) is a collaborative effort on chemical biological weapons disarmament between Harvard University and Science and Technology Policy Research (SPRU) at the University of Sussex. It was formed by Matthew Meselson and Julian Perry Robinson to provide research, training, seminars, and information work on chemical biological warfare and its disarmament. In 2010, Sussex faculty member Caitriona McLeish was appointed co-director of the HSP.

The program is well known for its unique large archival collection of CBW related documents at Sussex (SHIB - Sussex Harvard Information Bank).

HSP is an academic Non-Governmental Organization (NGO) that has influenced policy creation from within the United States and Great Britain on the formation of the Chemical Weapons Convention (CWC) and reviews of the Biological Weapons Convention (BWC).

References

External links
Welcome to the Harvard Sussex Program

SPRU web site

Business schools in England
Genetics or genomics research institutions
Innovation in the United Kingdom
Innovation organizations
Multidisciplinary research institutes
Nanotechnology institutions
Public policy schools
Research and development in the United Kingdom
Research institutes in East Sussex
Science and technology think tanks based in the United Kingdom
Social science institutes
Systems science institutes
University of Sussex